Quantitative linguistics (QL) is a sub-discipline of general linguistics and, more specifically, of mathematical linguistics. Quantitative linguistics deals with language learning, language change, and application as well as structure of natural languages. QL investigates languages using statistical methods; its most demanding objective is the formulation of language laws and, ultimately, of a general theory of language in the sense of a set of interrelated languages laws. Synergetic linguistics was from its very beginning specifically designed for this purpose.
QL is empirically based on the results of language statistics, a field which can be interpreted as statistics of languages or as statistics of any linguistic object. This field is not necessarily connected to substantial theoretical ambitions. Corpus linguistics and computational linguistics are other fields which contribute important empirical evidence.

History
The earliest QL approaches date back in the ancient Greek and Indian world. One of the historical sources consists of applications of combinatorics to linguistic matters, another one is based on elementary statistical studies, which can be found under the header colometry and stichometry.

Language laws
In QL, the concept of law is understood as the class of law hypotheses which have been deduced from theoretical assumptions, are mathematically formulated, are interrelated with other laws in the field, and have sufficiently and successfully been tested on empirical data, i.e. which could not be refuted in spite of much effort to do so. Köhler writes about QL laws: "Moreover, it can be shown that these properties of linguistic elements and of the relations among them abide by universal laws which can be formulated strictly mathematically in the same way as common in the natural sciences. One has to bear in mind in this context that these laws are of stochastic nature; they are not observed in every single case (this would be neither necessary nor possible); they rather determine the probabilities of the events or proportions under study. It is easy to find counterexamples to each of the above-mentioned examples; nevertheless, these cases do not violate the corresponding laws as variations around the statistical mean are not only admissible but even essential; they are themselves quantitatively exactly determined by the corresponding laws. This situation does not differ from that in the natural sciences, which have since long abandoned the old deterministic and causal views of the world and replaced them by statistical/probabilistic models."

Linguistic laws
In quantitative linguistics, linguistic laws are statistical regularities emerging across different linguistic scales (i.e. phonemes, syllables, words or sentences) that can be formulated mathematically and that have been deduced from certain theoretical assumptions. They are also required to have been successfully tested through the use of data, that is, not to have been refuted by empirical evidence. Among the main linguistic laws proposed by various authors, the following can be highlighted: 
 Zipf's law: The frequency of words is inversely proportional to their rank in frequency lists. Similar distribution between rank and frequency of sounds, phonemes, and letters can be observed.
 Heaps' law: It describes the number of distinct words in a document (or set of documents) as a function of the document length.
Brevity law or Zipf's law of abbreviation: It qualitatively states that the more frequently a word is used, the 'shorter' that word tends to be.
 Menzerath's law (also, Menzerath-Altmann law): This law states that the sizes of the constituents of a construction decrease with increasing size of the construction under study. The longer, e.g. a sentence (measured in terms of the number of clauses) the shorter the clauses (measured in terms of the number of words), or: the longer a word (in syllables or morphs) the shorter the syllables or words in sounds).
 Law of diversification: If linguistic categories such as parts-of-speech or inflectional endings appear in various forms it can be shown that the frequencies of their occurrences in texts are controlled by laws.
 Martin's law: This law concerns lexical chains which are obtained by looking up the definition of a word in a dictionary, then looking up the definition of the definition just obtained etc. Finally, all these definitions form a hierarchy of more and more general meanings, whereby the number of definitions decreases with increasing generality. Among the levels of this kind of hierarchy, there exists a number of lawful relations.
 Law of language change: Growth processes in language such as vocabulary growth, the dispersion of foreign or loan words, changes in the inflectional system etc. abide by a law known in QL as Piotrowski law, and corresponds to growth models in other scientific disciplines. The Piotrowski law is a case of the so-called logistic model (cf. logistic equation). It was shown that it covers also language acquisition processes (cf. language acquisition law).
 Text block law: Linguistic units (e.g. words, letters, syntactic functions and constructions) show a specific frequency distribution in equally large text blocks.

Stylistics
The study of poetic and also non-poetic styles can be based on statistical methods; moreover, it is possible to conduct corresponding investigations on the basis of the specific forms (parameters) language laws take in texts of different styles. In such cases, QL supports research into stylistics: One of the overall aims is evidence as objective as possible also in at least part of the domain of stylistic phenomena by referring to language laws. One of the central assumptions of QL is that some laws (e.g. the distribution of word lengths) require different models, at least different parameter values of the laws (distributions or functions) depending on the text sort a text belongs to. If poetic texts are under study QL methods form a sub-discipline of Quantitative Study of Literature (stylometrics).

Important authors
 Gabriel Altmann (1931)
 Otto Behaghel (1854–1936); cf. Behaghel's laws
 Karl-Heinz Best
 Sergej Grigor'evič Čebanov (1897–1966)
 William Palin Elderton (1877–1962)
 Gertraud Fenk-Oczlon
 Ernst Wilhelm Förstemann (1822–1906)
 Wilhelm Fucks (1902–1990)
 Peter Grzybek
 Gustav Herdan (1897–1968)
 Luděk Hřebíček (1934)
 Friedrich Wilhelm Kaeding (1843–1928)
 Reinhard Köhler
 Snježana Kordić (1964)
 Werner Lehfeldt (1943)
 Viktor Vasil'evič Levickij (1938–2012)
 Haitao Liu
 Helmut Meier (1897–1973)
 Paul Menzerath (1883–1954), cf. Menzerath's law
 Sizuo Mizutani (1926)
 Augustus De Morgan (1806–1871).
 Charles Muller, Straßburg
 Raijmund G. Piotrowski
 L.A. Sherman
 Juhan Tuldava (1922–2003)
 Andrew Wilson, Lancaster
 Albert Thumb (1865–1915)
 George Kingsley Zipf (1902–1950); cf. Zipf's law
 Eberhard Zwirner (1899–1984). Phonometry

See also
Quantitative comparative linguistics

Notes

References
 Karl-Heinz Best: Quantitative Linguistik. Eine Annäherung. 3., stark überarbeitete und ergänzte Auflage. Peust & Gutschmidt, Göttingen 2006, .
 Karl-Heinz Best, Otto Rottmann: Quantitative Linguistics, an Invitation. RAM-Verlag, Lüdenscheid 2017. .
 Reinhard Köhler with the assistance of Christiane Hoffmann: Bibliography of Quantitative Linguistics. Benjamins, Amsterdam/ Philadelphia 1995, .
 Reinhard Köhler, Gabriel Altmann, Gabriel, Rajmund G. Piotrowski (eds.): Quantitative Linguistik - Quantitative Linguistics. Ein internationales Handbuch – An International Handbook. de Gruyter, Berlin/ New York 2005, .
 Haitao Liu & Wei Huang. Quantitative Linguistics：State of the Art, Theories and Methods. Journal of Zhejiang University (Humanities and Social Science). 2012，43(2)：178-192. in Chinese.

External links

IQLA - International Quantitative Linguistics Association

 
Quantitative research
Applied linguistics